The R935 road is a regional road in Ireland which links the N55 road with the R212 regional road in Cavan in County Cavan.

See also 

 Roads in Ireland
 National primary road
 National secondary road

References 

Regional roads in the Republic of Ireland

Roads in County Cavan